Yuniesky Betancourt Pérez (born January 31, 1982) is a Cuban former professional baseball shortstop. Betancourt played in Major League Baseball (MLB) for the Milwaukee Brewers, Seattle Mariners, and Kansas City Royals. He played in the Cuban National Series for Villa Clara before he defected from Cuba. In 2019, he became the first former MLB player to return to the Cuban national baseball system after defecting from the country. However, he never played a game for Villa Clara in 2019. In Cuba, he is nicknamed "Riquimbili".

Cuban leagues
His early career was spent in the Cuban leagues, including Villa Clara of the Serie Nacional. He was considered the fastest second baseman in the Cuban leagues and the star of the Villa Clara team. He left Cuba on a speedboat in December 2003  and ended up in Mexico, where he played for a while before signing with Seattle Mariners scouts Bob Engle and Patrick Guerrero on January 26, 2005. He made his major league debut on July 28, .

Professional career

Seattle Mariners (2005–09)

Betancourt's initial calling card had been his fielding. In his first few seasons, he had been considered one of the best fielders in the game, combining excellent range, quickness, soft hands, hand-eye coordination, and a strong, accurate throwing arm. He was named one of the top fielders in baseball in a  online fan's poll. In 2007, he made many good fielding plays; however, he suffered through spells of throwing wildness that season. He turned things around and made only 5 errors in the second half of 2007.

Betancourt has been a hitter with some gap power who rarely strikes out or walks. He has been criticized for his lack of plate discipline and inability to bunt. In 2006, he walked only 3.0% of the time, the second-worst percentage in Major League Baseball. However, he only struck out 9.7% of the time, one of the top 20 percentages.

Betancourt was among the league leaders in batting with runners in scoring position and game-winning RBI in 2007. In a late season game in 2007, former Mariner Mike Blowers referred to Betancourt as being "unreal" when batting with runners on in close late games-a result at odds with his career statistics. He hit his first grand slam in a 7–6 win against the Chicago White Sox on August 11, 2007.

In 2008, he again walked only 3.0% of the time, the worst percentage in Major League Baseball.
His strikeout rate dropped to 7.5%. He also saw the fewest pitches per plate appearance of all major leaguers, 3.15.

Kansas City Royals (2009–10)
On July 10, 2009, he was acquired by the Kansas City Royals along with a portion of his salary for Minor League pitchers Derrick Saito and Dan Cortes.

In 2009, he had the lowest on-base percentage of any starter in the major leagues, at .274, and the lowest slugging percentage in the American League with .351.

In 2010, he hit an opening day home run off Detroit Tigers pitcher Justin Verlander, and went on to finish the season with a career-high 16 home runs.  Many of his other statistics, including his batting average, on-base percentage, and fielding percentage, increased slightly from his 2009 numbers.

Milwaukee Brewers (2011)
On December 19, 2010, Betancourt was traded to the Milwaukee Brewers along with teammate Zack Greinke and US$2,000,000, reportedly to offset the buyout of Betancourt's club option in 2012, for Alcides Escobar, Lorenzo Cain, Jeremy Jeffress, and Jake Odorizzi.

In 2011, he batted .252 with a .271 on-base percentage, and led the NL in sacrifice flies, with 10. He saw the fewest pitches per plate appearance of all major league ballplayers with 512 or more plate appearances, at 3.16.

Betancourt hit his first career postseason home run on October 9, 2011 in a 9–6 win over the St. Louis Cardinals in Game 1 of the NLCS.

Despite having the lowest on-base-percentage of any qualifying shortstop in baseball, he started a majority of the games for the Brewers. Against the Padres on May 9, 2011, Betancourt had one of the most acrobatic double plays of the season, as he turned a ball hit up the middle into a running, behind-the-back toss to Rickie Weeks as they turned the double play. Nevertheless, he posted below average defensive marks by a number of advanced metrics.

Return to Kansas City (2012)
On December 20, 2011, Betancourt signed a one-year deal to return to Kansas City worth $2 million. He was released by the Royals on August 14, becoming a free agent. He had played in 57 games, starting 51, with a .228 average and .256 OBP.

Philadelphia Phillies (2013)
On January 28, 2013, Betancourt signed a minor league deal with the Philadelphia Phillies with an invitation to spring training. On March 24, 2013 the Phillies released Betancourt.

Return to Milwaukee (2013)
On March 26, 2013, pending a physical, Betancourt signed a 1-year deal to return to the Milwaukee Brewers.  In the first few weeks of the season, he was the MLB leader in home runs. He played 137 games with a slash line of .212/.240/.355. His batting average and on-base percentage were the worst of his career, and his slugging percentage was well below his career average of .388.

Orix Buffaloes
On January 28, 2014 Betancourt signed a 1-year deal with the Orix Buffaloes of Nippon Professional Baseball. On July 22, 2014 he was released from the Orix Buffaloes with an injury.

Mexican League
On April 21, 2015, Betancourt signed with the Toros de Tijuana of the Mexican Baseball League. He was released on April 29, 2015. On April 10, 2017, Betancourt signed with the Leones de Yucatán. On March 11, 2018, Betancourt was traded to the Guerreros de Oaxaca.

Return to Cuba
In late March of 2019, it was reported that Betancourt had successfully repatriated and joined the Santa Clara team in the Villa Clara Provincial League. He thus became the first Cuban ex-MLB player to return to the Cuban national baseball system. Betancourt is expected to rejoin Villa Clara for the 2019–20 Cuban National Series, as he has previously stated a desire to finish his career playing for his hometown team.

See also

List of baseball players who defected from Cuba

References

External links

 

1982 births
Living people
Águilas de Mexicali players
Cuban expatriate baseball players in Mexico
Defecting Cuban baseball players
Guerreros de Oaxaca players
Kansas City Royals players
Leones de Yucatán players
Major League Baseball players from Cuba
Cuban expatriate baseball players in the United States
Major League Baseball shortstops
Mexican League baseball infielders
Milwaukee Brewers players
Naranjas de Villa Clara players
Nippon Professional Baseball first basemen
Nippon Professional Baseball second basemen
Nippon Professional Baseball third basemen
Northwest Arkansas Naturals players
Omaha Storm Chasers players
Orix Buffaloes players
People from Santa Clara, Cuba
San Antonio Missions players
Seattle Mariners players
Tacoma Rainiers players
Toros de Tijuana players